Sofia Alexandra Cepa Escobar Ferreira da Silva (born November 29, 1984) is a Portuguese soprano singer and actress. She is best known for being part of the cast in West End musicals, in London. She performed the role of Maria in West Side Story. Her most acclaimed role was Christine Daaé, the lead character in Andrew Lloyd Webber's Phantom of the Opera.

Biography 
Sofia Alexandra Cepa Escobar Ferreira da Silva was born on November 29, 1984 in Guimarães, Braga, Portugal.

She studied at Conservatório de Música do Porto in Oporto, Portugal, and continued her studies at the Guildhall School of Music and Drama.

She had a scholarship that paid for her tuition. Her parents could not afford her studies in London, and took out a mortgage on their house to pay for her studies. Sofía worked as a waitress in a restaurant near the school after classes for 5 pounds an hour, until 2am.

Personal life 
On September 21, 2013 she married the Spanish actor, Gonzalo Ramos in an intimate ceremony in Guimarães, Portugal. On March 6, 2014, she gave birth to the couple's first child, a boy, whom they called Gabriel Ramos Escobar.

Career
Escobar's first experience in the West End musicals was with The Phantom of the Opera, after having been the lead understudy actress in 2007 and 2008.

She played the lead Hanna Gzelak character in the Portuguese musical Scents of Light.

She performed in the West Side Story, taking the role of Puerto Rican girl Maria.

From 2010 to 2013 she played the role of Christine Daaé, the leading character in The Phantom of the Opera at Her Majesty's Theatre in Haymarket, London. She is one very few non-native English speakers to have portrayed Daaé in an English-language production.

As an actress he participated on the Portuguese TV series Morangos com Açúcar in 2003, as professor Olívia Matos, in 42 episodes. In 2009 Escobar was a judge on the Portuguese TV show Quem é o Melhor?.

On October 6, 2012, she performed a duet with Spanish tenor José Carreras in her hometown, invited by him.
Between 2015 and 2016, she was a jury member in the Got Talent Portugal program.
In 2016 she was part of the cast in the new Portuguese musical Eusébio, a tribute to the Portuguese footballer, that made it to the stage on April 6. And she is now on the "Entre o Céu e a Terra" play.

Awards and nominations 
Sofia Escobar won the "Best Actress in a Musical" award for by the Whatsonstage Theatregoer's Choice Awards while a performer in West Side Story. She has been nominated in the best actress category for the 2009 Laurence Olivier awards due to her performance of Maria in West Side Story.

She got a Portuguese Golden Globe nomination for Revelation of the Year 2010, where she sang "Think of Me" from The Phantom of the Opera.

References

External links
 Sofia Escobar bio at the Phantom of the Opera website
 

1984 births
Living people
Musical theatre actresses
People from Guimarães
Portuguese expatriates in England
21st-century Portuguese women singers
Portuguese film actresses
Portuguese television actresses